Rånerudåsen is a village in Re municipality, Norway. Its population is 206.

References

Villages in Vestfold og Telemark